This article contains information about the literary events and publications of 1542.

Events
The diary begun by Luca Landucci is completed by an unknown hand.
The earliest written example of the Romani language appears.

New books

Prose
Paul Fagius – Liber Fidei seu Veritatis
Edward Hall – The Union of the Two Noble and Illustrate Famelies of Lancastre & Yorke

Poetry
See 1542 in poetry

Births
December – Catherine Des Roches, French poet and writer (died 1587)
unknown date – John of the Cross (Juan de Yepes y Álvarez), Castilian poet and friar (died 1591)

Deaths
January 10 – Gerard Geldenhouwer, Dutch historian (born 1482)
June 14 – Christoph von Scheurl, German humanist writer (born 1481)
October 11 – Sir Thomas Wyatt, English poet (born 1503)
unknown date – Lucas Fernández, Spanish dramatist and musician, who wrote in the Leonese language (born c. 1474)

References

1542 books
 
Renaissance literature
Early Modern literature
Years of the 16th century in literature